The American Journal of Emergency Medicine, the oldest (1983) independent peer-reviewed medical journal, covering emergency medicine, is a monthly  journal covering all aspects of emergency medicine care. The editor-in-chief is J. Douglas White and it is published by Elsevier.

External links 
 

Publications established in 1983
Elsevier academic journals
Emergency medicine journals
9 times per year journals
English-language journals